The Battle of Tartu was fought between the 13th and 14th of January, 1919 in the Estonian War of Independence between the units of the Estonian 2nd Division and the forces of the Latvian Rifemen. The battle was a significant battle in the Estonian War of Independence. As a result of which, Estonian troops were able to conquer the rest of Southern Estonia.

Course of the Battle 
On January 9, the commander of the 2nd Division, Colonel Viktor Puskar, ordered the conquest of Tartu.  Anton Irv and Karl Parts, the commanders of the armored trains, met the Tartumaa Battalion who had reached the railway in Kaarepere and made a proposal to Julius Kuperjanov to go to Tartu together. Kuperjanov agreed and the partisans were accommodated on the train.

Before arriving in Tartu, armored trains had to hold smaller fights from the evening of January 13 in Voldi, Äksi and Kärkna.

Arriving near Tartu, armored train No. 1 sent out a landing, which conquered a bridge out-of-sight from bridge-saboteurs, so armored trains could safely cross the bridge and penetrate the city. During the battle, the Red Latvian army showed strength.

The city was cleared of the Red Forces on January 14. The remaining Latvians fled to the cities of Võru and Valga, and Estonian forces did not have the strength to pursue them.

Tartu Krediidikassa Massacre 

After Estonian troops arrived in Tartu, they found out that the Red forces had committed mass murder in Tartu, killing 19 civilians in the basement of the Tartu Credit Center at Kompanii Street 5, including the first Estonian Orthodox Bishop Plato, high priests Nikolai Bežanitski and Mikhail Bleive, and Moritz Wilhelm Paul Schwartz, pastor of Tartu St. John's Congregation, and 14 other civilians of Tartu.

Memorial 
In 1932, a memorial to the Battle of Tartu was installed in Tähtvere Park. It was demolished by the Soviets in 1941, rebuilt in 1942, demolished again in 1944 and rebuilt in 2006.

References 

Battles of the Estonian War of Independence
Tartu
1919 in Estonia
January 1919 events